Transvulcania is a long distance race that is held annually on La Palma, one of the western Canary Islands. It is considered one of the hardest mountain-ultramarathons in the world and one of the most important in Spain. The race has taken place on the island of La Palma since 2009, with the participation of many international runners.

Over time, additional races have been added to the original Transvulcania ultramarathon proper, currently:
 Vertical kilometer,  with an elevation gain of 
 Various children's races

Winners
Course records with green background.

References

External links

Ultramarathons
Athletics competitions in Spain
Mountain running competitions
Skyrunning competitions
Skyrunner World Series
Sport in La Palma
Vertical kilometer running competitions